Netball in Malawi is organized by the Netball Association of Malawi.

National team
The Malawi national netball team competes in international netball tournaments such as the Netball World Cup, the Commonwealth Games, the African Netball Championships, the Fast5 Netball World Series and the Diamond Challenge. Malawi's best performance at a major international tournament was a third place finish at the 2016 Fast5 Netball World Series. Malawi has defeated New Zealand, Australia and England in international tournaments. As of 1 July 2020, they are sixth in the INF World Rankings.

Competitions
Malawi's three regions – Central Region, Southern Region and Northern Region – all have regional leagues. The top teams from the regions play in two national competitions,  the Presidential Championship and the Champions League. The latter competition was launched in 2013 and was sponsored by GOtv Africa. It initially featured the top teams from Blantyre and Lilongwe but in 2015 it was expanded to included teams from Mzuzu. In 2014 and 2017 the Champions League used Fast5 netball rules in order to help the Malawi national netball team prepare for the 2014 and 2017 Fast5 Netball World Series tournaments.

Club teams

Notable players

Gallery

References